Wei Yang (born 1963) is a Chinese-American structural biologist. She is a distinguished investigator at the National Institutes of Health and was elected a member of the US National Academy of Sciences in 2013.

Early life and education 
Yang was born in Shanghai, China in 1963. She entered Fudan University in 1980, before transferring to Stony Brook University in the United States in 1983, where she earned her B.A. degree. She earned her M.A. (1985) and Ph.D. (1991) in Biochemistry & Molecular Biophysics from Columbia University.

Career and research 
Since 1995 she has been a senior scientist in the Laboratory of Molecular Biology at the National Institutes of Health. Her research mainly focuses on DNA mismatch repair, translesion synthesis, and V(D)J recombination. Her lab discovered that DNA synthesis and RNA degradation reactions are propelled by cation trafficking and require transiently bound Mg²⁺ and K⁺ ions that are absent in the static structures of substrate- or product-enzyme complexes.

Awards and honors 
In 2011, the Protein Society honored Yang with the Dorothy Crowfoot Hodgkin Award. She was elected a member of the National Academy of Sciences in 2013 and a fellow of the American Academy of Arts and Sciences in 2015. She has naturalized as a US citizen.

References

1963 births
Living people
American women biologists
Members of the United States National Academy of Sciences
Fellows of the American Academy of Arts and Sciences
Biologists from Shanghai
Columbia University alumni
American people of Chinese descent
People's Republic of China emigrants to the United States
Chinese women biologists
National Institutes of Health faculty
Fudan University alumni
Stony Brook University alumni
20th-century Chinese scientists
21st-century Chinese scientists
20th-century American biologists
21st-century American biologists
Expatriate academics in the United States
20th-century American women scientists
21st-century American women scientists
Structural biologists
Naturalized citizens of the United States